Chuang Che (born 1934) is a Chinese artist. His work is largely abstract, combining influences of his Chinese heritage with Abstract Expressionism.

Early life 
Chuang Che was born in Beijing, where his father was working as a scholar and calligrapher at the National Palace Museum. It was his father who introduced him to calligraphy, a medium which later had a profound influence on his art. In his twenties, Chuang studied fine arts at National Taiwan Normal University, where he learned about Eastern painting traditions. Che felt that there was more that could be brought to Eastern painting, and so when he graduated in 1958, he joined several other artists, including Liu Guosong, Fong Chung-Ray, and Sun Duoci, and became one of the first members of the Fifth Moon Group (which had been founded two years earlier). The group sought to modernize Chinese art, making it contemporary and straying from the old traditions. These ideals appealed to Chuang, who wanted to add something modern to the Eastern sensibilities he had been taught first by his father and then in school.

Artistic career 
In 1966, Chuang was awarded a John D. Rockefeller III Foundation travel grant, which allowed him to move to the United States and study art. He first moved to Iowa, studying at the University of Iowa. However, he shortly after moved to New York, becoming the assistant of the sculptor Seymour Lipton. In New York, Che was surrounded by contemporary artists, exposing him to Western painting styles - the most popular of the time being Abstract Expressionism. He was inspired by these contemporary styles, and decided to have his art act as a sort of confluence of East and West. He began painting works that were inspired both by his traditional Eastern education, often evoking calligraphy, and by the bold abstractions of Abstract Expressionism that he encountered in New York. His work was successful, catching the eye of many museums and galleries. He showed his work around the U.S. and Europe, and in 1992 a Retrospective Exhibition for him was held at the Taipei Fine Arts Museum.

Chuang lives in New York, working in his studio in the East Village. His work has been shown as part of Asia Week New York.

Major public collections 

 Taipei Fine Arts Museum, Taipei, Taiwan
 Cleveland Museum of Art, Cleveland, Ohio, United States
 Cornell University, Ithaca, New York, United States
 The Detroit Museum, Detroit, Michigan, United States
 Detroit Institute of Arts, Michigan, United States
 Hong Kong Museum of Art, Hong Kong, China
 National Museum of History, Taipei, Taiwan
 Saginaw Art Museum, Michigan, United States
 Spencer Museum of Art, The University of Kansas, Lawrence, Kansas, United States
 University of Michigan Museum of Art, Ann Arbor, Michigan, United States
 Shanghai Art Museum, Shanghai, China
 Guangdong Museum of Art, Guangdong, China
 Museum of Central Academy of Fine Arts, China
 List Visual Arts Center at MIT, Cambridge, Massachusetts, United States
Harvard Art Museums, Cambridge, Massachusetts, United States
Herbert F. Johnson Museum of Art, Ithaca, New York, United States

Selected solo exhibitions 

 2021 Findlay Galleries, New York, New York, United States
 2019 Vazieux | Art Gallery Paris, Paris, France
 2016 Galerie Sabine Vazieux and Galerie Hervé Courtaigne, Paris, France
 2015 Taipei Fine Arts Museum, Taipei, Taiwan
 2012 Asia Art Center, Taipei, Taiwan
 2007 National Art Museum of China, Beijing, China
 2006 Asia Art Center, Taipei, Taiwan
 2005 National Museum of History, Taipei, Taiwan
 2005 Kuandu Museum of Fine Art, Taipei National University of the Arts, Taiwan
 2002 Guangdong Art Museum, China
 1980 National Museum of History, Taipei, Taïwan
 1977 Kalamazoo Institute of Art, Kalamazoo, Michigan, United States
 1977 Saginaw Art Museum, Michigan, United States
 1972 Newark Art Museum, Newark, New Jersey, United States
 1972 Montclair Art Museum, Montclair, New Jersey, United States
 1970 Fine Art Museum, Flint, Michigan, United States
 1968 Taiwan Provincial Museum, Taipei, Taiwan
 1965 National Taiwan Arts Hall, Taipei, Taiwan

Major group exhibitions 

 Museum of Ixelles, Brussels, Belgium
Forsythe Gallery, Ann Arbor, Michigan, United States
 Francine Seders Gallery, Seattle, Washington, United States
 Magic Touch Gallery, Taipei, Taiwan
 Lung Men Gallery, Taipei, Taiwan
 De Graaf Gallery, Chicago, Illinois, United States
 Alisan Art Gallery, Hong Kong, China
 Paidea Gallery, Los Angeles, California, United States
 Shaw-Rimington Gallery, Toronto, Canada

Catalogues 

 Chuang Che. Deep Ridge - Remote Way. Solo exhibition in National Art Museum of China. Paintings 1963–2007. Asia Art Center and the Center Academy of Fine Arts. 2007.
 Michael Sullivan. Moderne chinese artists, a biographical dictionary. University of California Press. 2006.
 A Tradition Redefined. Modern and contemporary Chinese Ink Paintings from the Chu-tsing Li Collection (1950-2000). Yale University press. 2007.
 Five Chinese Painters, Fifth Moon Exhibition. National Museum of History, Taipei, 1970.
 The Modernist Wave. Taiwan Art in the 1950s and 1960s. National Taiwan Museum of Fine Arts. 2011.

Bibliography

External links 
Galerie Sabine Vazieux

1934 births
Living people
Artists from Beijing
Chinese emigrants to the United States
American artists of Chinese descent
University of Iowa alumni
National Taiwan Normal University alumni
20th-century Chinese painters
21st-century Chinese painters
Abstract painters